Cox oder Der Lauf der Zeit ("Cox or The passage of time") is a 2016 novel by the Austrian writer Christoph Ransmayr. It is set in the 18th century and revolves the English master clockmaker Alister Cox, who is invited by the Qianlong Emperor to come and work in the Forbidden City, where he is given a succession of seemingly impossible requests.

The Cox character is inspired by the real inventor James Cox. The real Cox never visited China, although the Qianlong Emperor did own one of his works.

Reception
Gisa Funck of Deutschlandfunk wrote: "In Cox oder Der Lauf der Zeit, Ransmayr describes the clash between two highly different cultures. A strength of this in several respects masterful novel lies in how he tells us about the strangeness of the Chinese empire, without suppressing the local perspective."

The French translation was longlisted for the 2017 Prix Femina in the foreign novel category.

See also
 Cox's timepiece

References

External links
 German publicity page 

2016 novels
21st-century Austrian novels
Austrian historical novels
German-language novels
Novels by Christoph Ransmayr
Novels set in the 18th century
Novels set in Beijing
Novels set in the Qing dynasty
Qianlong Emperor
S. Fischer Verlag books